Naturally occurring cobalt (Co) consists of a single stable isotope, Co. Twenty-eight radioisotopes have been characterized; the most stable are Co with a half-life of 5.2714 years, Co (271.8 days), Co (77.27 days), and Co (70.86 days). All other isotopes have half-lives of less than 18 hours and most of these have half-lives of less than 1 second. This element also has 11 meta states, all of which have half-lives of less than 15 minutes.

The isotopes of cobalt range in atomic weight from Co to Co. The main decay mode for isotopes with atomic mass less than that of the stable isotope, Co, is electron capture and the main mode of decay for those of greater than 59 atomic mass units is beta decay. The main decay products before Co are iron isotopes and the main products after are nickel isotopes.

Radioactive isotopes can be produced by various nuclear reactions. For example, Co is produced by cyclotron irradiation of iron. The main reaction is the (d,n) reaction Fe + H → n + Co.

List of isotopes 

|-
| 47Co
| style="text-align:right" | 27
| style="text-align:right" | 20
| 47.01149(54)#
|
|
|
| 7/2−#
|
|
|-
| 48Co
| style="text-align:right" | 27
| style="text-align:right" | 21
| 48.00176(43)#
|
| p
| 47Fe
| 6+#
|
|
|-
| rowspan=2|49Co
| rowspan=2 style="text-align:right" | 27
| rowspan=2 style="text-align:right" | 22
| rowspan=2|48.98972(28)#
| rowspan=2|<35 ns
| p (>99.9%)
| 48Fe
| rowspan=2|7/2−#
| rowspan=2|
| rowspan=2|
|-
| β+ (<.1%)
| 49Fe
|-
| rowspan=2|50Co
| rowspan=2 style="text-align:right" | 27
| rowspan=2 style="text-align:right" | 23
| rowspan=2|49.98154(18)#
| rowspan=2|44(4) ms
| β+, p (54%)
| 49Mn
| rowspan=2|(6+)
| rowspan=2|
| rowspan=2|
|-
| β+ (46%)
| 50Fe
|-
| 51Co
| style="text-align:right" | 27
| style="text-align:right" | 24
| 50.97072(16)#
| 60# ms [>200 ns]
| β+
| 51Fe
| 7/2−#
|
|
|-
| 52Co
| style="text-align:right" | 27
| style="text-align:right" | 25
| 51.96359(7)#
| 115(23) ms
| β+
| 52Fe
| (6+)
|
|
|-
| rowspan=2 style="text-indent:1em" | 52mCo
| rowspan=2 colspan="3" style="text-indent:2em" | 380(100)# keV
| rowspan=2|104(11)# ms
| β+
| 52Fe
| rowspan=2|2+#
| rowspan=2|
| rowspan=2|
|-
| IT
| 52Co
|-
| 53Co
| style="text-align:right" | 27
| style="text-align:right" | 26
| 52.954219(19)
| 242(8) ms
| β+
| 53Fe
| 7/2−#
|
|
|-
| rowspan=2 style="text-indent:1em" | 53mCo
| rowspan=2 colspan="3" style="text-indent:2em" | 3197(29) keV
| rowspan=2|247(12) ms
| β+ (98.5%)
| 53Fe
| rowspan=2|(19/2−)
| rowspan=2|
| rowspan=2|
|-
| p (1.5%)
| 52Fe
|-
| 54Co
| style="text-align:right" | 27
| style="text-align:right" | 27
| 53.9484596(8)
| 193.28(7) ms
| β+
| 54Fe
| 0+
|
|
|-
| style="text-indent:1em" | 54mCo
| colspan="3" style="text-indent:2em" | 197.4(5) keV
| 1.48(2) min
| β+
| 54Fe
| (7)+
|
|
|-
| 55Co
| style="text-align:right" | 27
| style="text-align:right" | 28
| 54.9419990(8)
| 17.53(3) h
| β+
| 55Fe
| 7/2−
|
|
|-
| 56Co
| style="text-align:right" | 27
| style="text-align:right" | 29
| 55.9398393(23)
| 77.233(27) d
| β+
| 56Fe
| 4+
|
|
|-
| 57Co
| style="text-align:right" | 27
| style="text-align:right" | 30
| 56.9362914(8)
| 271.74(6) d
| EC
| 57Fe
| 7/2−
|
|
|-
| 58Co
| style="text-align:right" | 27
| style="text-align:right" | 31
| 57.9357528(13)
| 70.86(6) d
| β+
| 58Fe
| 2+
|
|
|-
| style="text-indent:1em" | 58m1Co
| colspan="3" style="text-indent:2em" | 24.95(6) keV
| 9.04(11) h
| IT
| 58Co
| 5+
|
|
|-
| style="text-indent:1em" | 58m2Co
| colspan="3" style="text-indent:2em" | 53.15(7) keV
| 10.4(3) μs
|
|
| 4+
|
|
|-
| 59Co
| style="text-align:right" | 27
| style="text-align:right" | 32
| 58.9331950(7)
| colspan="3" style="text-align:center;"|Stable
| 7/2−
| 1.0000
|
|-
| 60Co
| style="text-align:right" | 27
| style="text-align:right" | 33
| 59.9338171(7)
| 5.2713(8) y
| β−, γ
| 60Ni
| 5+
|
|
|-
| rowspan=2 style="text-indent:1em" | 60mCo
| rowspan=2 colspan="3" style="text-indent:2em" | 58.59(1) keV
| rowspan=2|10.467(6) min
| IT (99.76%)
| 60Co
| rowspan=2|2+
| rowspan=2|
| rowspan=2|
|-
| β− (.24%)
| 60Ni
|-
| 61Co
| style="text-align:right" | 27
| style="text-align:right" | 34
| 60.9324758(10)
| 1.650(5) h
| β−
| 61Ni
| 7/2−
|
|
|-
| 62Co
| style="text-align:right" | 27
| style="text-align:right" | 35
| 61.934051(21)
| 1.50(4) min
| β−
| 62Ni
| 2+
|
|
|-
| rowspan=2 style="text-indent:1em" | 62mCo
| rowspan=2 colspan="3" style="text-indent:2em" | 22(5) keV
| rowspan=2|13.91(5) min
| β− (99%)
| 62Ni
| rowspan=2|5+
| rowspan=2|
| rowspan=2|
|-
| IT (1%)
| 62Co
|-
| 63Co
| style="text-align:right" | 27
| style="text-align:right" | 36
| 62.933612(21)
| 26.9(4) s
| β−
| 63Ni
| 7/2−
|
|
|-
| 64Co
| style="text-align:right" | 27
| style="text-align:right" | 37
| 63.935810(21)
| 0.30(3) s
| β−
| 64Ni
| 1+
|
|
|-
| 65Co
| style="text-align:right" | 27
| style="text-align:right" | 38
| 64.936478(14)
| 1.20(6) s
| β−
| 65Ni
| (7/2)−
|
|
|-
| 66Co
| style="text-align:right" | 27
| style="text-align:right" | 39
| 65.93976(27)
| 0.18(1) s
| β−
| 66Ni
| (3+)
|
|
|-
| style="text-indent:1em" | 66m1Co
| colspan="3" style="text-indent:2em" | 175(3) keV
| 1.21(1) μs
|
|
| (5+)
|
|
|-
| style="text-indent:1em" | 66m2Co
| colspan="3" style="text-indent:2em" | 642(5) keV
| >100 μs
|
|
| (8-)
|
|
|-
| 67Co
| style="text-align:right" | 27
| style="text-align:right" | 40
| 66.94089(34)
| 0.425(20) s
| β−
| 67Ni
| (7/2−)#
|
|
|-
| 68Co
| style="text-align:right" | 27
| style="text-align:right" | 41
| 67.94487(34)
| 0.199(21) s
| β−
| 68Ni
| (7-)
|
|
|-
| style="text-indent:1em" | 68mCo
| colspan="3" style="text-indent:2em" | 150(150)# keV
| 1.6(3) s
|
|
| (3+)
| 
| 
|-
| rowspan=2|69Co
| rowspan=2 style="text-align:right" | 27
| rowspan=2 style="text-align:right" | 42
| rowspan=2|68.94632(36)
| rowspan=2|227(13) ms
| β− (>99.9%)
| 69Ni
| rowspan=2|7/2−#
| rowspan=2|
| rowspan=2|
|-
| β−, n (<.1%)
| 68Ni
|-
| rowspan=2|70Co
| rowspan=2 style="text-align:right" | 27
| rowspan=2 style="text-align:right" | 43
| rowspan=2|69.9510(9)
| rowspan=2|119(6) ms
| β− (>99.9%)
| 70Ni
| rowspan=2|(6-)
| rowspan=2|
| rowspan=2|
|-
| β−, n (<.1%)
| 69Ni
|-
| style="text-indent:1em" | 70mCo
| colspan="3" style="text-indent:2em" | 200(200)# keV
| 500(180) ms
|
|
| (3+)
|
|
|-
| rowspan=2|71Co
| rowspan=2 style="text-align:right" | 27
| rowspan=2 style="text-align:right" | 44
| rowspan=2|70.9529(9)
| rowspan=2|97(2) ms
| β− (>99.9%)
| 71Ni
| rowspan=2|7/2−#
| rowspan=2|
| rowspan=2|
|-
| β−, n (<.1%)
| 70Ni
|-
| rowspan=2|72Co
| rowspan=2 style="text-align:right" | 27
| rowspan=2 style="text-align:right" | 45
| rowspan=2|71.95781(64)#
| rowspan=2|62(3) ms
| β− (>99.9%)
| 72Ni
| rowspan=2|(6- ,7-)
| rowspan=2|
| rowspan=2|
|-
| β−, n (<.1%)
| 71Ni
|-
| 73Co
| style="text-align:right" | 27
| style="text-align:right" | 46
| 72.96024(75)#
| 41(4) ms
|
|
| 7/2−#
|
|
|-
| 74Co
| style="text-align:right" | 27
| style="text-align:right" | 47
| 73.96538(86)#
| 50# ms [>300 ns]
|
|
| 0+
|
|
|-
| 75Co
| style="text-align:right" | 27
| style="text-align:right" | 48
| 74.96833(86)#
| 40# ms [>300 ns]
|
|
| 7/2−#
|
|

Use of cobalt radioisotopes in medicine 
Cobalt-57 (Co or Co-57) is used in medical tests; it is used as a radiolabel for vitamin B uptake. It is useful for the Schilling test.

Cobalt-60 (Co or Co-60) is used in radiotherapy. It produces two gamma rays with energies of 1.17 MeV and 1.33 MeV. The Co source is about 2 cm in diameter and as a result produces a geometric penumbra, making the edge of the radiation field fuzzy. The metal has the unfortunate habit of producing fine dust, causing problems with radiation protection. The Co source is useful for about 5 years but even after this point is still very radioactive, and so cobalt machines have fallen from favor in the Western world where linacs are common.

Industrial uses for radioactive isotopes

Cobalt-60 (Co) is useful as a gamma ray source because it can be produced in predictable quantities, and for its high radioactivity simply by exposing natural cobalt to neutrons in a reactor. The uses for industrial cobalt include:
Sterilization of medical supplies and medical waste
Radiation treatment of foods for sterilization (cold pasteurization)
Industrial radiography (e.g., weld integrity radiographs)
Density measurements (e.g., concrete density measurements)
Tank fill height switches

Cobalt-57 is used as a source in Mössbauer spectroscopy of iron-containing samples. Electron capture by Co forms an excited state of the Fe nucleus, which in turn decays to the ground state with the emission of a gamma ray. Measurement of the gamma-ray spectrum provides information about the chemical state of the iron atom in the sample.

References

 Isotope masses from:

 Isotopic compositions and standard atomic masses from:

 Half-life, spin, and isomer data selected from the following sources.

 
Cobalt
Cobalt